Châtres-la-Forêt is a former commune in the Mayenne department in north-western France. On 1 January 2019, it was merged into the commune Évron.

See also 

 Communes of the Mayenne department

References 

Chatreslaforet